Mr. Bones 2: Back from the Past is a 2008 South African comedy film directed by Gray Hofmeyr, co-written by Hofmeyr and Leon Schuster, and starring Leon Schuster, Tongayi Chirisa, Leeanda Reddy, Kaseran Pillay, Meren Reddy. It is the second film in the Mr. Bones series.

Released by Videovision Entertainment, Mr. Bones 2 was a blockbuster hit, surpassing Mr Bones to become the most financially successful film released in South Africa.

Plot 
Mr. Bones 2: Back from the Past takes place in 1879, and the titular character is the great, great grandfather of the Mr. Bones from the first film. It is the story of Hekule, the King of Kuvukiland who is given a gemstone by the dying Kunji Balanadin. The stone is cursed and causes Hekule to become possessed by the spirit of the mischievous Kunji, which Bones describes as "wild rider". It is up to Mr. Bones to cure his King and get rid of this cursed stone by travelling 130 years into the future, in the city of Durban. They meet a woman named Reshmi who gave them important clues to the gem and returning the gem to its home in an Indian fishing village named Ataram. However, they must also contend with Reshmi's fiancé, who wants the gem for himself.

Cast 
 Leon Schuster as Bones, a white sangoma who grew up in a traditional African tribe in the fictitious Kuvukiland after the plane he was flying in as a baby crashed outside the Royal kraal.
 Tongayi Chirisa as Hekule, the King of Kuvukiland
 Leeanda Reddy as Reshmi
 Kaseran Pillay as Kunji Balanadin
 Meren Reddy as Kerrit
 Keith Gengadoo as Eyepatch
 Gray Hofmeyr as Bolly, macaw I

Release 
Mr Bones 2: Back from the Past premiered at the Inkosi Albert Luthuli International Convention Centre in Durban on November 13, 2008, ahead of its worldwide November 27 release date.

References

External links 
 
 

2008 films
Films set in South Africa
Films shot in South Africa
2008 comedy films
South African comedy films
South African sequel films
English-language South African films
Afrikaans-language films